The Canadian Special Operations Regiment (CSOR) is a  special forces unit of the Canadian Armed Forces and forms part of Canadian Special Operations Forces Command (CANSOFCOM). As a special forces unit, the regiment's roles include conducting complex or difficult raids, capturing strategic facilities and undertaking reconnaissance. It is also capable of working with the armed forces of other countries.

Unit history 

The unit traces its roots to the First Special Service Force (FSSF), the joint Canadian–American special forces unit that was stood up in 1942 and earned the "Devil's Brigade" moniker for daring night raids on German forces at the Anzio beachhead.

CSOR perpetuates the battle honours of the FSSF.

Recruiting for the new unit took place in early 2006, and the first CSOR selection course took place with approximately 175 candidates.

On 13 August 2006, an official stand-up ceremony for CSOR took place at the unit's home station, Canadian Forces Base (CFB) Petawawa, with approximately 250 soldiers participating. The ceremony included a skills demonstration including rappelling from helicopters, and both static and freefall parachuting. It was also announced that the second training serial of CSOR recruits would take place in early 2007. The first commanding officer and regimental sergeant-major of CSOR were Lieutenant-Colonel (LCol) Jamie Hammond and Chief Warrant Officer (CWO) Gerald Scheidl.

The regiment suffered its first casualty on 24 June 2011: Master-Corporal Francis Roy died in a non-combat incident while deployed in Kandahar Province, Afghanistan.

In 2013, the unit competed in an international special forces competition held in Jordan, coming in third place after Chinese Special Police teams took first and second place.

In March 2015, Sgt Andrew Joseph Doiron was killed by friendly fire while serving on Operation Impact in Iraq.

Operations and exercises
The regiment maintained a presence in Afghanistan from 2006 to 2014 in support of Canada's mission in Afghanistan.

Under the auspices of the Anti-Crime Capacity Building Program of Global Affairs Canada, CSOR conducted training with both the Jamaica Defence Force and the Belize Defence Force, culminating in Exercise Tropical Dagger.

CSOR participates in Exercise Flintlock, a special operations forces–focused exercise planned, coordinated and executed by African partner nations and sponsored by United States Africa Command.

CSOR participates in the CANSOFCOM commitment to Operation Impact, the Canadian Armed Forces' support to the international military intervention against ISIL in Iraq and Syria.

Due to the Taliban offensive in 2021, CSOR operators were deployed to Afghanistan to assist Canadian embassy staff to leave and destroy anything sensitive.

In January 2022, CSOR was deployed to Ukraine.

Organization

While the regiment is composed of personnel from the Canadian Army, Royal Canadian Navy and Royal Canadian Air Force, it is part of CANSOFCOM, a joint command reporting directly to the Chief of the Defence Staff, responsible for providing agile, high-readiness special operations forces capable of operating across the spectrum of conflict at home and abroad. 

CANSOFCOM is composed of CSOR, 427 Special Operations Aviation Squadron, and the Canadian Special Operations Training Centre in Petawawa, Joint Task Force 2 (JTF-2) in Ottawa,  and the Canadian Joint Incident Response Unit in Trenton.

Battle honours

Regimental association
The Canadian Special Operations Regiment Association was incorporated May 2016 and founded to provide an avenue to resources and support services, including training, social services, family education grants, emergency support services and the like.

References

Bibliography

External links

Canadian Special Operations Regiment Association
Special Force CBC Documentary

Airborne units and formations of Canada
Canadian Special Operations Force Command
Military units and formations established in 2006
Regiments of Canada
Special forces of Canada
Military counterterrorist organizations
Army reconnaissance units and formations